Nautica is a clothing company.

Nautica may also refer to:

 , a cruise ship owned and operated by Oceania Cruises
 Nautica Waterfront District, an area of The Flats in Cleveland, Ohio
 Jacobs Pavilion at Nautica, formerly named Nautica Stage and Nautica Pavilion

See also
 
 Nautical